Bali District is a suburban district in northwestern New Taipei, Taiwan. In Taiwanese Hokkien, it was known as Pat-lí-hun (八里坌) during the rule of the Qing dynasty.

History

Based on examinations of grave goods it is believed that the ancient settlement of Shihsanhang was one of the wealthiest in Taiwan, it was only one of two communities in prehistoric Taiwan to master iron smelting. The ironware they produced was traded throughout Taiwan.

During the period of Japanese rule, Bali was called , and was governed under Tamsui District of Taihoku Prefecture. After the handover of Taiwan from Japan to the Republic of China in 1945, Bali became a rural township of Taipei County. On 25 December 2010, it became a district of New Taipei City.

Administrative divisions
Bali District administers ten urban villages:

Education
Bali district has one high school, one municipal middle school, and five elementary schools, including the New Taipei Municipal DaKan Elementary School.

Tourist attractions
 Shihsanhang Museum of Archaeology
 Sustainable Development Education Center
 Wazihwei Nature Reserve
 Bali Old Street
 Bali Left Bank Park
 Bali Sailing Pier
 Shisanhang Cultural Park
 New Taipei City Archeology Park
 Bali Shanggang Park (八里商港公園)
 Danjiang Bridge Vision Pavilion

Transportation
 Port of Taipei
 Provincial Highways 15, 61 and 64, and City Route 105
 Bali Ferryboat Wharf
 Bali light rail (Expected to open in 2024 at the earliest)

References

External links 

 

Districts of New Taipei
Taiwan placenames originating from Formosan languages